Hogum Bay is a bay in the U.S. state of Washington.

According to tradition, the name Hogum refers land investors who quickly bought up (i.e. "hogged") land around the bay.

References

Landforms of Thurston County, Washington
Bays of Washington (state)